Tamaria is a genus of echinoderms belonging to the family Ophidiasteridae.

The genus has almost cosmopolitan distribution.

Species:

Tamaria dubiosa 
Tamaria floridae 
Tamaria fusca 
Tamaria giffordensis 
Tamaria halperni 
Tamaria hirsuta 
Tamaria lithosora 
Tamaria marmorata 
Tamaria megaloplax 
Tamaria obstipa 
Tamaria ornata 
Tamaria pusilla 
Tamaria scleroderma 
Tamaria tenella 
Tamaria triseriata 
Tamaria tumescens

References

Ophidiasteridae
Asteroidea genera